Valary Jemeli Aiyabei is a Kenyan long-distance runner. In 2019, she set a new course record of 2:19:10 in the Frankfurt Marathon.

In 2018, she won the Beijing Marathon with a time of 2:21:38.

Achievements

References

External links 
 

Living people
Year of birth missing (living people)
Place of birth missing (living people)
Kenyan female long-distance runners
Kenyan female marathon runners
21st-century Kenyan women